Paul Jelfs (born 6 May 1953) is an Australian former rugby union and professional rugby league footballer who played in the 1970s and 1980s. He played for Sydney's Eastern Suburbs and South Sydney clubs in the New South Wales Rugby League (NSWRL) competition.

Jelfs played in 20 matches for the Eastern Suburbs club before joining South Sydney in 1981 playing in a further 6 matches. Jelfs formerly played rugby union with the Eastern Suburbs rugby union club before switching codes to play rugby league in 1978.

References

 

Australian rugby union players
Australian rugby league players
Sydney Roosters players
Living people
Place of birth missing (living people)
South Sydney Rabbitohs players
1953 births